Susan Olivia Poole (1889–1975) was an Indigenous Canadian inventor. She invented the Jolly Jumper, a baby jumper, in 1910, but it was not until 1948 that they were produced for the retail market. They are manufactured in Ontario, Canada. By 1957, the Jolly Jumper was patented.

Early life 
Born in 1889 in Devil's Lake, North Dakota, Poole grew up in Minnesota at the White Earth Indian Reservation. She was part Ojibway or Chippewa. At a young age, she observed how women would strap babies to cradle boards, a practice called "papoose". While working in the fields, she also observed how mothers would hang their papooses on tree branches, using leather straps, as a medium for a soft bouncing motion.

Education 
Poole was a very talented pianist. She studied music at Manitoba, Canada's Brandon College.

Personal life 
Poole married and had seven children, the first a boy named Joseph. After his birth, she began putting a swing together that resembled the practice she remembered as a young girl. After her invention, she moved to Vancouver, British Columbia with her husband in 1942.

Invention 
Poole used a broom handle and cloth diaper in her first attempts at creating the swing that is now known as "The Jolly Jumper". The broom handle was used as a suspension bar and the diaper for a harness. By the early 1950s, her family convinced her to take the swing commercially. She was awarded a patent in 1957, with the help of her son Joseph. She was one of the first Indigenous Canadian women to be awarded a patent. She later established Poole Manufacturing Co., Ltd, which she sold in the 1960s.

Later years 
Poole died at the age of 86 on October 10, 1975, in Ganges, Capital Regional District, British Columbia, Canada. She is buried at Royal Oak Burial Park Cemetery in Victoria, Capital Regional District, British Columbia, Canada. Her invention is still being sold today. There are over 200 items manufactured under the Jolly Jumper name, including potty trainers, baby accessories, car seats, etc.

References

External links 
 Dubé, D. (June 29, 2017). How one Canadian woman changed the parenting game with this baby invention. Retrieved April 2, 2019, from 
 MIT Program. (n.d.). Retrieved April 2, 2019, from https://lemelson.mit.edu/resources/olivia-poole
 Passport 2017. (October 19, 2017). Retrieved April 2, 2019, from https://passport2017.ca/articles/shout-susan-olivia-poole

1889 births
1975 deaths
People from Minnesota
Canadian inventors
20th-century American inventors
American emigrants to Canada